My Girlfriend may refer to:
"My Girlfriend" (Relient K song)
"My Girlfriend" (Sean Kingston song)
"My Girlfriend", a song by Lil' Romeo from Romeoland
"My Girlfriend", a song by Uncle Kracker from Happy Hour
My Girlfriend (TV series), a 2019 Chinese television series

See also
Girlfriend (disambiguation)